Australian rules football is a sport played in over sixty countries around the world.

This list does not include the International Rules Series and tests between Ireland and Australia, which is played in International Rules Football and not Australian Rules Football.

Tournaments and matches may differ from traditional Australian Football in terms of the ground used, the number of players fielded on a team and the number of Australian expatriates permitted to participate. Of these tournaments, the Australian Football International Cup currently has the most strict player eligibility rules and adherence to the Laws of Australian Football.

The following is a list of past and present international tournaments where the sport is or has been played:

See also

References

External links

 
History of Australian rules football
Australian rules football-related lists
Lists of sports events in Australia